Capsicum conicum may refer to:

 A synonym of Capsicum annuum
 A synonym of Capsicum baccatum